Crinum moorei is a herbaceous plant belonging to the family Amaryllidaceae, and native to South Africa (the Cape Provinces and KwaZulu-Natal).

Taxonomy

Synonyms
Homotypic
Amaryllis moorei (Hook.f.)
Heterotypic
Crinum imbricatum Baker
Crinum colensoi Baker
Crinum mackenii Baker
Crinum makoyanum Carrière
Crinum moorei var. album hort.
Crinum moorei var. platypetala hort.
Crinum moorei var. rubra Hannibal
Crinum natalense Baker
Crinum schmidtii Regel

Hybrids
Crinum × powellii Baker
Crinum × worsleyi W.Watson

References

moorei
Flora of the Cape Provinces
Flora of KwaZulu-Natal
Taxa named by Joseph Dalton Hooker